Sioux Falls Regional Airport , also known as Joe Foss Field, is a public and military use airport three miles northwest of Sioux Falls, South Dakota, United States. It is named in honor of aviator and Sioux Falls native Joe Foss, who later served as the 20th Governor of South Dakota (1955–1959).

The National Plan of Integrated Airport Systems for 2011–2015 categorized it as a primary commercial service airport since it has over 10,000 passenger boardings (enplanements) per year. Federal Aviation Administration records say the airport had 423,288 enplanements in calendar year 2011, an increase of 18.92% from 355,939 in 2010.

Joe Foss Field Air National Guard Station is home to Headquarters, South Dakota Air National Guard and its 114th Fighter Wing (114 FW). The 114 FW is an Air Combat Command gained unit known as the "Fighting Lobos" and operates F-16C/D aircraft. The South Dakota Adjutant General is based in Camp Rapid in Rapid City, South Dakota, but the South Dakota Air National Guard is effectively headquartered with the 114 FW.

History 

Sioux Falls Regional Airport was built on its present site as an airfield in 1937. In early 1942, the city approached the Federal Government and later leased the airport and surrounding property to become the Sioux Falls Army Air Base. The major function of the base was the establishment of a radio operator training facility. Between 1942 and 1945, about 40,000 radio operators were trained in Sioux Falls. The base was also a logistical supply center and its grid of streets now make up an industrial area just south of the present day airport. In 1946 the airport and surrounding land was transferred back to the city and the South Dakota Air National Guard was established under the direction of future airport namesake Joe Foss. The Air National Guard Base portion of the airport is south and west of the commercial and general aviation areas, north of Russell Street, and has all the standard facilities of a small USAF installation except for family housing. The 114th's F-16C and F-16D aircraft are a frequent sight over the Sioux Falls area, conducting training flights and routine operations.

The first airline flights were Mid-Continent Airlines, around 1940; successor Braniff left about 1967. Western Airlines arrived in 1955, North Central in 1957 and Ozark in 1962. By 1992, the airport had 28 daily flights from eight airlines.

In 2005, Sioux Falls Regional Airport became one of the first airports in the country to de-federalize its workforce. Covenant Aviation Security previously provided baggage and passenger screening under contract with the Transportation Security Administration under the Screening Partnership Program. Currently, the Trinity Technology Group provides security screening functions.

Facilities
Joe Foss Field covers 1,570 acres (635 ha) at an elevation of 1,430 feet (436 m). It has three concrete runways:
3/21 is 9,000 by 150 feet (2,743 x 46 m), 15/33 is 8,000 by 150 feet (2,438 x 46 m), and 9/27 is 3,148 by 75 feet (960 x 23 m) by  150 feet. It has one asphalt helipad, H1, 50 by 50 feet (15 x 15 m).

The terminal has seven gates, all with loading bridges. Five gates can accommodate up to an Airbus A320 family or Boeing 737 family size aircraft while gate number 5 can accommodate up to a Boeing 757 and gate number 2 can only accommodate a CRJ 200 or ERJ-145. CBP facilities exist for general aviation and cargo use, but large charter and scheduled passenger are not accepted.

In 2017 the airport had 73,221 aircraft operations, average 201 per day: 38% air taxi, 39% general aviation, 16% airline and 7% military. 111 aircraft were then based at this airport: 49.5% single-engine, 31% multi-engine, 16% military and 4% jet.

Renovations 

The Costello Terminal building opened in 1970 and has undergone numerous renovations over the years including ones in 1990, 2003 and 2005.

Beginning in the spring of 2009, the Sioux Falls Regional Airport embarked on a three-phase, multi-year, multi-million-dollar renovation and expansion project, designed by Koch Hazard Architects to update the look and feel of the airport. Projects included renovating and expanding the ticketing and check-in counter area, moving all TSA screening equipment behind the ticketing counters into a more secure location, renovating and relocating the ground floor gift shop, updating and renovating the concourse, adding a new business lounge, renovating the restaurant in the upper concourse, installing three new jet bridges, and updating and re-configuring the airport's parking operations. By 2012, these projects were completed and more improvements were announced. From March to October 2012, the terminal's lower level restaurant was overhauled and renovated to become Wildcat Corner. Another long-term parking lot was built due to high demand; from August to September 2012, the airport was closed over a course of four weekends to almost all air traffic to allow a runway intersection to be rebuilt. In 2014 work began to replace the dated escalators, to open and finish renovating the lobby of the terminal, and expand the security checkpoint. That same year, work also commenced on an onsite hotel attached to the north end of the current terminal building. The hotel mainly caters to business travelers and has about 70 rooms.

Future projects include construction of additional holding aprons for aircraft at the end of each runway, continued pavement rehabilitation, completion of a west side access road, improvements to airport parking, a new control tower, new landing and updated navigational aids for all runways, additional land easements for flood control, runway safety zones, conservation efforts, an additional baggage carousel, a parking ramp and a new concourse.

A large terminal expansion was announced in November 2022 which will add multiple gates and two additional departure lounges. Construction is tentatively anticipated to begin in 2025 or 2026.

Airlines and destinations

Passenger

Cargo

Statistics

Top destinations

Airline statistics

Ground transportation
As of 2022, there is no public transit service to the Sioux Falls Regional Airport. The nearest Sioux Area Metro bus stop is located approximately one mile away.

Incidents 
On March 8, 1972, two people died after a Cessna arriving from Fairmont, Minnesota hit power lines on final approach.

On June 16, 1981, one person died and three people were injured after a single-engine Cessna experienced engine failure and crashed on takeoff.

On November 30, 1982, two people died after a Cessna P210 crashed short of the runway at night in fog.

On September 24, 1983, a modified ultralight aircraft crashed during an air show, killing its pilot and only occupant.

On November 6, 1983, a Convair 580 operating for Republic Airways struck a bird on landing, which penetrated the windshield and hit the captain in the face. The first officer completed the landing without further incident.

On December 20, 1983, Ozark Air Lines Flight 650 struck a snow plow on the runway while landing, killing the driver of the snow plow.

On December 9, 2011, a Cessna 421-C aircraft crashed shortly after takeoff less than a mile from the airport into an open field. All 4 passengers on board were killed when the aircraft burst into flames upon crashing.

On April 8, 2018, an Allegiant Airlines McDonnell Douglas MD-83 arriving from Las Vegas overran the runway due to snow and ice. No passengers were injured.

On December 25, 2018, a Beechcraft Baron, registered N6745V, crashed in southeast Sioux Falls while approaching runway 33. The pilot and one passenger died.

References

External links 

 Sioux Falls Regional Airport, official website
   at South Dakota Airport Directory
 Aerial image as of August 1991 from USGS The National Map
 
 
 

Airports in South Dakota
Buildings and structures in Sioux Falls, South Dakota
Transportation in Sioux Falls, South Dakota
Airports established in 1943
1943 establishments in South Dakota